The Buchan-Hepburn Baronetcy, of Smeaton-Hepburn in the County of Haddington, is a title in the Baronetage of the United Kingdom. It was created on 6 May 1815 for George Buchan-Hepburn. He was a Judge of the Admiralty Court from 1790 to 1791 and a Baron of the Exchequer for Scotland from 1791 to 1814. Born George Buchan, he assumed by Royal licence the additional surname of Hepburn in 1764, which was that of his maternal grandfather. His grandson, the third Baronet (who succeeded his father), represented Haddington in the House of Commons from 1838 to 1847. His son, the fourth Baronet, was a deputy lieutenant of Haddingtonshire. On the death of his grandson, the sixth Baronet, in 1992, the line of the eldest son of the second Baronet failed. The late Baronet, stepfather of the Duchess of Northumberland, was succeeded by his third cousin, the seventh and holder of the title. He was succeeded by his grandson in 2022. The family surname is pronounced "Bukkan-Hebburn".

Patrick Buchan-Hepburn, 1st Baron Hailes, was the third son of the fourth Baronet.

Buchan-Hepburn baronets, of Smeaton-Hepburn (1815)

Sir George Buchan-Hepburn, 1st Baronet (1739–1819)
Sir John Buchan-Hepburn, 2nd Baronet (1776–1833)
Sir Thomas Buchan-Hepburn, 3rd Baronet (1804–1893)
Sir Archibald Buchan-Hepburn, 4th Baronet (1852–1929)
Sir John Karslake Thomas Buchan-Hepburn, 5th Baronet (1894–1961)
Sir Ninian Buchan Archibald John Buchan-Hepburn, 6th Baronet (1922–1992)
Sir John Alastair Trant Kidd Buchan-Hepburn, 7th Baronet (1931–2022)
Sir John James Christopher Thomas Buchan-Hepburn, 8th Baronet (b. 1992)

The heir apparent is the present holder's younger brother, Henry Robert Buchan-Hepburn (b. 1997)

Notes

References
Kidd, Charles & Williamson, David (editors). Debrett's Peerage and Baronetage (1990 edition). New York: St Martin's Press, 1990, 

Buchan-Hepburn